Aestuariimicrobium is a singleton genus in the phylum Actinomycetota (Bacteria), whose first member, namely Aestuariimicrobium kwangyangense, was isolated from a diesel contaminated  coastal site. Like all Actinobacteria, it is gram-positive and with a high CG content (69%). It is rod/coccoid shaped bacterium whose main quinone is menaquinone-7 (MK7).

Etymology
The name Aestuariimicrobium derives from the Latin noun , the part of the sea coast which, during the flood-tide, is overflowed, but at ebb-tide is left covered with mud or slime, a tidal flat; New Latin neuter gender noun , microbe; New Latin neuter gender noun Aestuariimicrobium, a microbe isolated from tidal flat. The adjective kwangyangense, means of or pertaining to Kwangyang, Korea, from where the type strain was isolated.

See also
 Bacterial taxonomy
 Microbiology

References 

Bacteria genera
Propionibacteriales
Monotypic bacteria genera